The United States District Court for the District of South Dakota (in case citations, D.S.D.) is the United States District Court or the Federal district court, whose jurisdiction for issues pertaining to federal law or diversity for the state of South Dakota.  The court is based in Sioux Falls with other courthouses in Rapid City, Pierre, and Aberdeen.  The district was created in 1889, when the Dakota Territory was divided into North and South Dakota.

Appeals from the District of South Dakota are taken to the United States Court of Appeals for the Eighth Circuit (except for patent claims and claims against the U.S. government under the Tucker Act, which are appealed to the Federal Circuit).

The United States Attorney's Office for the District of South Dakota, represents the United States in civil and criminal litigation in the court.  the Acting United States Attorney for the District of South Dakota is Dennis R. Holmes.

Current judges

:

Vacancies and pending nomination

Former judges

Chief judges

Succession of seats

See also
 Courts of South Dakota
 List of current United States district judges
 List of United States federal courthouses in South Dakota
 United States Attorney for the District of South Dakota

References

External links

United States Attorney for the District of South Dakota Official Website

South Dakota
South Dakota law
Sioux Falls, South Dakota
Rapid City, South Dakota
Pierre, South Dakota
Brown County, South Dakota
1889 establishments in South Dakota
Courthouses in South Dakota
University of South Dakota School of Law alumni
Courts and tribunals established in 1889